Vanquish may refer to:

 Aston Martin Vanquish, a grand tourer automobile
 Vanquish, a brand name formulation of dicamba pesticide
 Vanquish (analgesic), a brand of over-the-counter analgesic
 Vanquish (video game), a 2010 third-person shooter video game
 Vanquish (album), a 2016 album by Two Steps from Hell
 Vanquish (film), a 2021 film starring Morgan Freeman